Mice and Mystics is a fantasy-themed dungeon crawling cooperative board game designed by Jerry Hawthorne and published by Plaid Hat Games in 2012. In the games, the players represent fantasy characters transformed into anthropomorphic mice, on a quest to escape from the evil wizard's lair. The game has been praised for its original theme, with player's characters using buttons and needles instead of shields and swords, and fighting insects and cats instead of goblins and dragons.

Awards 

 2013 Golden Geek Best Board Game Artwork/Presentation Nominee
 2013 Golden Geek Best Board Game Artwork/Presentation Winner
 2013 Golden Geek Best Family Board Game Nominee
 2013 Golden Geek Best Thematic Board Game Nominee
 2013 UK Games Expo Best Boardgame Nominee
 2013 UK Games Expo Best Boardgame Winner
 2014 As d'Or - Jeu de l'Année Nominee
 2014 Lys Passioné Finalist

Reception 
Since its release in 2011, the game has been consistently ranked in around Top 350 position of the most popular wargames on BoardGameGeek.

Adaptation
In October 2018, DreamWorks Animation acquired the rights to the role-playing game. A feature film is in development. Alexandre Aja, long-time horror film director, will be directing and writing the film's script along with David Leslie Johnson. Vertigo Entertainment’s Roy Lee and Jon Berg are producing.

See also
 Redwall

References

External links 
 

Board games introduced in 2012
Fantasy board games
Mice and rats in popular culture
Cooperative board games
Dungeon crawler board games